Gummosis is the formation of patches of a gummy substance on the surface of certain plants, particularly fruit trees. This occurs when sap oozes from wounds or cankers as a reaction to outside stimuli such as adverse weather conditions, infections, insect problems, or mechanical damage. It is understood as a plant physiological disease.

References

External links
 Video and commentary on gummosis on a cherry tree.

Physiological plant disorders